Overstreet Hall is a historic academic building on the campus of Southern Arkansas University in Magnolia, Arkansas.  It is located at the junction of East University and North Jackson Streets, occupying a prominent visual position approaching the campus from the south.  It is a three-story brick building with Colonial Revival features.  It has a hip roof with dormers, and a Doric order six-column portico with pediments at the center of the main facade.  It was built in 1941–43 with funding support from the Works Progress Administration.  It currently houses the university's administrative offices.

The building was listed on the National Register of Historic Places in 2016.

See also
National Register of Historic Places listings in Columbia County, Arkansas

References

University and college buildings completed in 1943
National Register of Historic Places in Columbia County, Arkansas
Southern Arkansas University
University and college buildings on the National Register of Historic Places in Arkansas
Works Progress Administration in Arkansas
1943 establishments in Arkansas
Colonial Revival architecture in Arkansas